HD 152079 b is an eccentric Jupiter gas giant discovered by the Magellan Planet Search Program in 2010.

References 

Exoplanets discovered in 2010
Exoplanets detected by radial velocity
Giant planets
Ara (constellation)